Dyamapur is a village in Dharwad district of Karnataka, India.

Demographics 
As of the 2011 Census of India there were 82 households in Dyamapur and a total population of 375 consisting of 178 males and 197 females. There were 61 children ages 0-6.

References

Villages in Dharwad district